Crazy Loka is a 2012 Kannada film starring V. Ravichandran and Daisy Bopanna. The film is directed by Kavita Lankesh and produced by Confident Group and Shanti Pictures. Manikanth Kadri is the music director for the film.

Cast 
 Ravichandran as Basavaraj Kattimane
 Daisy Bopanna as Sarala
 Bharathi Vishnuvardhan
 Harshika Poonachha as Chandini 
 Vijay Suriya as Abhay
 Avinash as Ganapathi 
 Neenasam Ashwath as Harihara 
 Ramya as item number "Ghalabe Ghalabe"

Soundtrack 

Music composer Manikanth Kadri has composed 7 songs. Actress Ramya has made a special appearance in the song "Ghalabe Ghalabe", performed by Chaitra H. G..

Reception

Critical response 

A critic from The Times of India scored the film at 3.5 out of 5 stars and says "Ravichandran marvels as Basavaraja. Daisy Bopanna is smart. Avinash excels as an innocent college principal with excellent body language and dialogue delivery. Camera by AC Mahender is good. Music by Manikant Kadri is okay". Srikanth Srinivasa from Rediff.com scored the film at 3 out of 5 stars and wrote "Manikanth Kadri's music is average except for Daisy's song. A C Mahendran's camera work is adequate. Kavitha Lankesh has made a youthful film and has tried to include a message to the youth along with entertainment". A critic from The New Indian Express wrote "Ramya’s special song forces itself in the film and gives a temporary glitz. The punch in the script could have been more powerful. The effort by cameraman, AC Mahendra and music by Manikanth Khadri is average". A critic from Bangalore Mirror wrote  "Avinash, as a fumbling principal, and Bharati Vishnuvardhan as his mother are the only two characters in the film which make you sit up and take note of the otherwise dull proceedings. And Ravichandran wears the worst wig since Rajkumari". S Viswanath from Deccan Herald wrote "With nothing working for it, be it a string of non-sensical songs, or crazier happenings, Crazy Loka is like a man with two left feet trying to entertain with his dance.Sorry Kavitha, it does not work despite your best of intentions".

References

2012 films
2010s Kannada-language films
Films directed by Kavitha Lankesh